King of Pop is a nickname most commonly associated with American singer Michael Jackson (1958–2009).

King of Pop may also refer to:
 Several other musicians, see honorific nicknames in popular music
 King of Pop (album), a  2008 compilation album by Michael Jackson
 Kings of Pop, a 2002 album by Home Grown
 Kings of Pop (cover artist), who covered a song by will.i.am
 King of Pop Awards, an annual Australian pop music award from 1967 to 1978 and a compilation album King of Pop '74–'75

See also
 King of Rock and Roll (disambiguation)
 Queen of Pop (disambiguation)
 Queen of Soul (disambiguation)